The Process is the debut studio album by American record production duo Play-N-Skillz from Dallas, Texas. Its clean version was released in 2004 and its explicit version was released on October 18, 2005 via Universal Records. It features contributions from Adina Howard, Akon, Big Gemini, Big Tuck, Chamillionaire, Frankie J, Krayzie Bone, Layzie Bone, Lil' Flip, Rob G, Static Major and Three 6 Mafia.

Track listing

Sample credits
Track 2 contains a sample of the composition "Gotta Get You Home Tonight" by Eugene Wilde
Track 9 contains sampled elements from the composition "Ocean of Thoughts and Dreams" by The Dramatics
Track 11 contains a sample of the composition "Moments in Love" by the Art of Noise
Track 13 contains interpolations from the composition "Kiss You Back" written by Ronald Brooks, Gregory Jacobs, George Clinton and Philippé Wynne
Track 14 contains a sample from the composition "Whatcha See is Whatcha Get" by The Dramatics

Personnel
Juan "Play" Salinas – main artist, producer, executive producer
Oscar "Skillz" Salinas – main artist, producer, executive producer
Stephen Ellis Garrett – featured artist (track 1)
Aliaune Damala Badara Akon Thiam – featured artist (track 2)
Paul Duane Beauregard – featured artist (track 4)
Jordan Michael Houston – featured artist (track 4)
Roberto Gallinares – featured artist (track 6)
Big Gemini – featured artist (track 6)
Hakeem Seriki – featured artist (track 7)
Steven L. Russell-Harts – backing vocals (track 7)
Cedric Lee Juan Tuck – featured artist (track 8)
Francisco Javier Bautista, Jr. – featured artist (track 9)
Anthony Henderson – featured artist (track 11)
Adina Howard – featured artist (track 11)
Wesley Eric Weston – featured artist (track 12)
Steven Howse – featured artist (track 15)
James Hoover – mixing (tracks: 1-6, 8-9)
Brian Stanley – mixing (track 7)
David Lopez – mixing (tracks: 11-15)
James Cruz – mastering
Charles Chavez – executive producer
Jonathan Mannion – photography

Charts

References

External links
 

Hip hop albums by American artists
2005 debut albums
Universal Music Group albums